Ižakovci (in older sources also Ižekovci, Prekmurje Slovene: Ižekofci) is a village on the left bank of the Mura River in the Municipality of Beltinci in the Prekmurje region of northeastern Slovenia.

Name
Ižakovci was attested in written sources in 1322 as Isakouc and Isacoush (and as Isakolch in 1381 and Isakowlch in 1428). The name of the settlement is derived from personal name Izak 'Isaac' and is a demonym meaning 'inhabitants of Isaac's village'. The phonemic change -z- > -ž- indicates that the Slovenian name developed through an intermediate German form.

Cultural heritage
There is a chapel in the centre of the village. It is dedicated to Our Lady of Mount Carmel and belongs to the Parish of Beltinci.

Notable people
Notable people that were born or lived in Ižakovci include:
Iván Persa (1861–1935), writer

References

External links 
Ižakovci on Geopedia

Populated places in the Municipality of Beltinci